

References 
 

.
.
 Russia
 Russia
Russia geology-related lists